Long John Silver is the seventh studio album by the American rock band Jefferson Airplane, and their last album of all new material until 1989. It was recorded and released in 1972 as Grunt FTR-1007.

Recording history
After several solo projects for Grunt Records, the members of Jefferson Airplane (including Paul Kantner, Grace Slick, Jorma Kaukonen, Jack Casady, Joey Covington and Papa John Creach) came together again in March 1972 for the first time in the studio since the Bark album was released in September 1971. Sessions at Wally Heider Studios continued for nearly three months, but tensions were high and several songs were recorded by each member recording their own part separately. David Crosby of Crosby, Stills, Nash and Young participated in the recording sessions, but Crosby's vocals were stripped from the record at the insistence of his label.

Joey Covington left the band during the sessions (accounts vary as to whether Covington was involuntarily dismissed); reflecting the balkanized milieu, veteran session drummer John Barbata (formerly of The Turtles and Crosby, Stills, Nash & Young) and Hot Tuna's Sammy Piazza deputized for the rest of the recording process. Barbata ultimately replaced Covington, playing on all but three songs.

Recording was completed in May, 1972; before the album's scheduled July release, RCA Records demanded that the band remove a line from the song "The Son of Jesus" electronically, which referred to a "bastard son of Jesus". Live performances of the song had the offending line intact.

Release and promotion
Released on the band's Grunt Records imprint, the album was Jefferson Airplane's least successful effort since their 1966 debut, only peaking at No. 20 on the Billboard album chart.

In July, the band began a two-month tour of the United States, their first major tour since 1970. It featured a new line-up including Kantner, Slick, Kaukonen, Casady, Creach, Barbata and former Quicksilver Messenger Service bassist David Freiberg as an additional vocalist/percussionist. A close friend of Kantner from the early 1960s American folk music revival scene, Freiberg took over Marty Balin's harmony parts and selected leads on ensemble efforts (most notably "Wooden Ships") and "tried to keep the band together."  The tour ended in September at San Francisco's Winterland Ballroom, with Balin joining for an encore. Live performances from the Chicago Auditorium Theatre and Winterland were released on the live album Thirty Seconds Over Winterland in 1973.

Original vinyl release
The original vinyl LP release (1972) featured an album cover that folded up into a replica of a cigar box.  The record sleeve bore an image of cigars; this image was later used as cover art on CD releases. The inside bottom of the box was covered with a photograph of marijuana.

Track listing

Personnel
Jefferson Airplane
Grace Slick – vocals, piano
Jack Casady – bass
Paul Kantner – vocals, rhythm guitar
Jorma Kaukonen – lead guitar, vocals
Papa John Creach – electric violin
John Barbata – drums, tambourine, "against the grain stubble scraping"
Joey Covington – drums on "Twilight Double Leader" and "The Son of Jesus"

Additional personnel
Sammy Piazza – drums on "Trial by Fire"

Production
Jefferson Airplane – producer, arrangements
Pat "Maurice the Magnificent" Ieraci – production coordinator
Don Gooch – engineer
Steve Barncard – special thanks
Pacific Eye & Ear – album concept, album design
Bob Tanenbaum, Propella Rotini – illustrations
Bruce Kinch – photography
Borris – weed. AKA Mike Trudnich
Recorded at the Wally Heider Studios, San Francisco

Charts
Album

Single

Notes

1972 albums
Jefferson Airplane albums
Albums recorded at Wally Heider Studios